COVID-19 simulation models are mathematical infectious disease models for the spread of COVID-19. The list should not be confused with COVID-19 apps used mainly for digital contact tracing.

Note that some of the applications listed are website-only models or simulators, and some of those rely on (or use) real-time data from other sources.

Models with the most scientific backing 

The sub-list contains simulators that are based on theoretical models. Due to the high number of pre-print research created and driving by the COVID-19 pandemic, especially newer models should only be considered with further scientific rigor.

Simulations and models

 Chen et al. simulation based on Bats-Hosts-Reservoir-People (BHRP) model (simplified to RP only)
 CoSim19 - Prof Lehr, based on SEIRD model
 COVID-19 MOBILITY MODELING - Stanford based on SEIR model
 COVID-19 Simulator - Harvard Medical School based on a validated system dynamics (compartment) model
 COVID-19 Surge - CDC
 COVIDSIM - by Mark Kok Yew Ng et al.
 CovidSim - Imperial College London, MRC Centre for Global Infectious Disease Analysis, Neil Ferguson et al.
 CovidSim - Research project by Munich University of Applied Sciences, Prof Köster
 COVIDSim - written in MATLAB by Ng and Gui
 CovidSIM.eu - Martin Eichner, Markus Schwehm supported by University of Tübingen and sponsored by the German Federal Ministry of Education and Research.
 CovidSIM - Schneider et al.
 CovRadar - for molecular surveillance of the Corona spike protein
 De-Leon and Pederiva - A  dynamic particle Monte Carlo algorithm based on the basic principles of statistical physics.
 Dr. Ghaffarzadegan’s model
 Event Horizon - COVID-19 - HU Berlin based on SIR-X model
 Evolutionary AI - "Non-pharmaceutical interventions (NPIs) that the AI generates for different countries and regions over time, their predicted effect."
 IHME model - Institute for Health Metrics and Evaluation COVID model
 MEmilio - an open source high performance Modular EpideMIcs simuLatIOn software based on hybrid graph-SIR-type model with commuter testing between regions and vaccination strategies and agent-based models
 OpenCOVID - Swiss Tropical and Public Health Institute (Swiss TPH) - Open access individual-based transmission model of SARS-CoV-2 infection and COVID-19 disease dynamics implemented in R.
 OxCGRT - The Oxford COVID-19 Government Response Tracker
 SC-COSMO - Stanford-CIDE Coronavirus Simulation Model
SECIR - Model by Helmholtz Centre for Infection Research
SEIR model on a small-world network used estimate the effect of non-pharmaceutical interventions on the structure of the transmission network
SIAM's Epidemiology Collection
SIRSS model that combines the dynamics of social stress with classical epidemic models. Social stress is described by the tools of social physics.
 Smart Investment of Virus RNA Testing Resources to Enhance Covid-19 Mitigation
 Youyang Gu COVID model

Genome databases 

Several of these models make use of genome databases, including the following: 
 DNA Data Bank of Japan
 European Nucleotide Archive
 GISAID
 Phylogenetic Assignment of Named Global Outbreak Lineages

Consortia, research clusters, other collections 

 CDC list of Forecast Inclusion and Assumptions - large list with different models, etc.
CORSMA - EU consortium (COVID-19-Outbreak Response combining E-health, Serolomics, Modelling, Artificial Intelligence and Implementation Research)
 COVID-19 Forecast Hub - Serves as a central repository of forecasts and predictions from over 50 international research groups.
 Nextstrain - Open-source project to harness the scientific and public health potential of pathogen genome data
See also Nextstrain SARS-CoV-2 resources
 SIMID - Simulation Models of Infectious Diseases - Belgium research consortium
 RAMP - Rapid Assistance in Modelling the Pandemic (UK)
 UT Austin COVID-19 Modeling Consortium
Computational Approaches to Foster Innovation in the Treatment and Diagnosis of Infectious Diseases by Frontiers

Vaccination monitors, models or dashboards 
Note: The following (additional) resources are mostly based on actual data, not simulation. They might include predictive features, e. g. vaccination rate estimation, but in general are not based on theoretical or modeling grounds as the main list of this article. Nonetheless, forecasting remains important. (See for example the COVID-19 Forecast Hub) 

 COVID-19 Dashboard - Center for Systems Science and Engineering (CSSE) at Johns Hopkins University (JHU)
COVIDVaxView by the CDC
Datahub Novel Coronavirus 2019 dataset - COVID-19 dataset Coronavirus disease 2019 (COVID-19) time series listing confirmed cases, reported deaths and reported recoveries.
Impfdashboard.de - Germany's vaccination monitor
 Simulation der COVID19-Impfkampagne - Monitor for vaccination-campaign in Germany by Zi Data Science Lab
 The Institute for Health Metrics and Evaluation (IHME) COVID-19 Projections
See also Institute for Health Metrics and Evaluation COVID model

Models with less scientific backing 

The following models are purely for educational purposes only.

 Cellular Defense Automata model
CoVariants - Overview of SARS-CoV-2 variants and mutations that are of interest
Covid-19 Simulator
 COVID19: Top 7 - A curated list posted on Medium
 github.com/topics: covid-19
 ISEE Systems COVID-19 Simulator
 nCoV2019.live - "Numbers you need at a quick glance" by Schiffmann/Conlon
cov19.cc- by Conlon
 Simul8 - COVID-19 Simulation Resources
 Simulating coronavirus with the SIR model
 Virus Spread Simulation

Other related simulations, models or data sources 
 (American Chemical Society) CAS COVID-19 BIOINDICATOR EXPLORER
CDC's COVID Data Tracker
 Civil Society Partners in Solidarity against COVID-19 (CSPAC): Full, live, global, COVID-19 Status Report for 251 locales & 71 Ships
 Cornell Institute for Social & Economic Research (CISER): COVID-19 Data Sources
 Eulerian–Lagrangian multiphase modeling, e. g. for transmission of COVID-19 in elevators based on CFD
Onset of Symptoms of COVID-19 simulation (Stochastic Progression Model) by Larsen et al.
 Our World in Data's Coronavirus Source Data
 The Atlantic's COVID 19 Tracking Project
 Vadere - Open Source Framework for Pedestrian and Crowd Simulation
WHO Coronavirus (COVID-19) Dashboard

Trainings and other resources 

 Infectious Disease Modelling Specialization - provided on Coursera by Imperial College London
 Introducing the COVID-19 Simulator and Machine Learning Toolkit for Predicting COVID-19 Spread - AWS Machine Learning Blog

See also 

 SIR Model
Computer simulation
 Mathematical modelling of infectious disease
 Computational biology
 Bioinformatics

References

Further reading

Articles

Books